AKI Academy for Art & Design is an art academy in the city Enschede in the Netherlands. The school was found in 1946 as Academie voor Kunst en Industrie (Academy for Art and Industry), but only retains the acronym 'AKI'. The school is part of the ArtEZ group of schools.

History 

The Academie voor Kunst en Industrie was found in 1946 by a group of textile manufacturers, to educate fabric designers for the local textile industry. Until 1955 Dirk van de Leeuw of the Instituut voor Kunstnijverheidsonderwijs was the director, after which the drawing teacher Bram Middelhoek (1906–1968) took over. In 1968, after some fifteen years of functioning as a traditional applied arts school, the AKI changed course to focus on free modern art with the appointment of Joop Hardy as new director. For several decades the school held the reputation of being the most free and rebellious art academy in the Netherlands. Hardy was followed by the artist Sipke Huismans, who held the directorial position from 1981 to 2001.

For a long time the school was housed in a modern building from 1957, designed by Arno Nicolaï, on the Roessinghsbleekweg in Enschede. Later the school moved to the 'Technohal' (a former chemical laboratory) on the campus of the University of Twente. In 2013 the school moved to the TETEM 2 building in the Roombeek district of Enschede. Until June 2015 the school had a dependance for painting students in the former village school of Twekkelo.

Due to educational reforms in the early 2000s, the AKI had to merge with other art academies to reach a certain cohort count. In 2002 they merged with the art academies in Arnhem and Zwolle and continued under the name ArtEZ Hogeschool voor de Kunsten. This caused distress amongst the students, who fought to retain the identity of the school. As a result the school has re-adopted its old name, AKI.

Education 
The academy offers three bachelor programmes called Fine Art, Crossmedia Design and Moving Image. All three programmes start out broad in the first year and then allow for specialisation. Experimentation and research are essential parts of the curriculum. There is a lot of focus on discussing work and formulating critique. Besides developing a professional attitude, there is space to hone knowledge and craft. The school has a variety of workshops and is one of the few academies in the Netherlands that still has a darkroom for photography.

Controversy 
In 2017 the director at that time, Marc Boumeester, was temporarily suspended after he was caught using drugs with students.

In September 2022 the school made news after a lawsuit from a wrongfully suspended student brought to light accounts of a fear culture.

Alumni 
A selection of well known past students:

 Daan Roosegaarde
 Anne Wenzel
 Irma Boom
 Jaap Drupsteen
 Jeroen Jongeleen
 Melle Nieling
 Bas Kosters
 Ine Lamers

References

External links 
 Official website

1946 establishments in the Netherlands
Educational institutions established in 1946
Art schools in the Netherlands
Buildings and structures in Enschede